Yasir Arafat (born 28 December 1984) is a Pakistani former cricketer. He played in 47 first-class and 36 List A matches between 2002 and 2013. He made his Twenty20 debut on 25 April 2005, for Multan Tigers in the 2004–05 National Twenty20 Cup.

References

External links
 

1984 births
Living people
Pakistani cricketers
Multan cricketers
Sui Northern Gas Pipelines Limited cricketers
Cricketers from Multan